Jesuit names on the Moon craters:

 Clavius (crater)
 Kircher (crater)
 Riccioli (crater)

External links 
 https://www.americamagazine.org/politics-society/2019/07/12/why-are-so-many-craters-moon-named-after-jesuits
 https://jesuits.org/news-detail?TN=NEWS-20190719121247
 https://www.vofoundation.org/blog/asteroids-named-for-jesuits/

Jesuits